Aulolaimoididae is a family of nematodes belonging to the order Dorylaimida.

Genera:
 Adenolaimus Andrássy, 1973
 Cladocephalus Swart & Heyns, 1991
 Oostenbrinkia Ali, Suryawanshi & Ahmed, 1973

References

Nematodes